Tom Scollay (born 28 November 1987) is an Australian former professional cricketer, a right-handed batsman and right-arm off-break bowler who most recently played for Middlesex. After leaving Middlesex CCC, he started his own coaching company called, "Cricket Mentoring." He is a Level 2 Cricket Australia Coach and is active on YouTube through the Cricket Mentoring channel. He continues to play Grade cricket in Australia for Perth Cricket Club.

Scollay was born in Alice Springs, Northern Territory, Australia.  He made his debut for Middlesex in a tour match against the Bangladeshis in July 2010 and scored 3 runs before being caught lbw from Faisal Hossain in a match that ended in a 141 run defeat for Middlesex. His top score for Middlesex in List A cricket came in 2010 in a game against Yorkshire at Lord's in only his second game as he scored 32 from 33 balls in a knock which included four 4's before being bowled by Ajmal Shahzad. His only wicket came in the same match as he bowled four overs for 21 runs, claiming the wicket of Andrew Gale. His T20 debut came for Middlesex against Hampshire in July 2011. He scored 8 and didn't bowl in a 7-wicket defeat.

References

External links
 

1987 births
Living people
People from Alice Springs
Australian cricketers
Middlesex cricketers
Cricketers from the Northern Territory
Sportsmen from the Northern Territory